Brana Ilić (born 16 February 1985) is a Serbian professional footballer who plays as a forward for Sloven Ruma.

Club career

Zemun and Rad
Ilić made his first senior appearances with Zemun in the 2003–04 First League of Serbia and Montenegro. He quickly established himself as a first-team regular, scoring four goals in 23 games. During his time at Zemun, Ilić amassed a total of 93 league appearances and scored 14 goals.

In the 2007 winter transfer window, Ilić moved to Serbian First League club Rad, spending there the next two years. He helped them win promotion to the Serbian SuperLiga in 2008.

Partizan and Vojvodina
On 9 January 2009, it was announced that Ilić signed a three-and-a-half-year contract with Partizan. He made his competitive debut for the club on 14 March, coming on as a late second-half substitute for Lamine Diarra in a 2–0 home league victory over Čukarički. Four days later, in his second appearance for Partizan, Ilić scored his first goal for the club, giving his team a 1–0 away win against Jagodina.

On 1 July 2010, it was announced that Ilić signed a one plus one-year contract with Vojvodina. He made 44 appearances across all competitions and scored 15 goals for the club, before leaving Novi Sad in the 2012 winter transfer window.

Kazakhstan, Greece and Hungary
In March 2012, Ilić moved abroad to Kazakhstan and signed with Aktobe. He made 10 appearances and scored three goals in the first half of the 2012 Kazakhstan Premier League, before leaving the club during the summer transfer window.

In the summer of 2012, Ilić joined Superleague Greece side PAS Giannina. He made his first appearance for the club on 25 August, playing the full 90 minutes in a 0–0 home league draw with Platanias. On 7 October, Ilić scored his first goal for PAS Giannina in a 1–2 home loss to Panionios. He finished his debut season as the club's top scorer with 11 goals (10 in the league). During his four-year tenure at PAS Giannina, Ilić amassed 138 competitive appearances and scored 28 goals for the club.

On 2 August 2016, Ilić signed with Football League club Aris Thessaloniki on a two-year contract plus one-year extension. He netted his first goals for the side on 18 December, scoring a brace in a 3–2 win over Trikala. Eventually, Ilić left Aris Thessaloniki after just one season.

After five years in Greece, Ilić moved to Hungary and joined Nemzeti Bajnokság II club Kisvárda in July 2017. He helped them gain promotion to the Nemzeti Bajnokság I in his debut season, contributing with 10 goals in 35 appearances.

International career
On 18 March 2011, Ilić received his first call-up to the Serbia national team for their UEFA Euro 2012 qualifiers against Northern Ireland and Estonia, but remained unused in both matches. He eventually made his debut in a friendly match against South Korea on 3 June 2011.

Career statistics

Club

International

Honours
Partizan
 Serbian SuperLiga: 2008–09, 2009–10
 Serbian Cup: 2008–09

Individual
Top Assist Super League Greece Runner-Up: 2014–15 (10 Goals with PAS Giannina)

References

External links
 
 
 

Association football forwards
Expatriate footballers in Greece
Expatriate footballers in Hungary
Expatriate footballers in Kazakhstan
FC Aktobe players
First League of Serbia and Montenegro players
FK Inđija players
FK Partizan players
FK Rad players
FK Vojvodina players
FK Železničar Pančevo players
FK Zemun players
Football League (Greece) players
Kazakhstan Premier League players
Nemzeti Bajnokság I players
Nemzeti Bajnokság II players
PAS Giannina F.C. players
Serbia and Montenegro footballers
Serbia international footballers
Serbian expatriate footballers
Serbian expatriate sportspeople in Greece
Serbian expatriate sportspeople in Hungary
Serbian expatriate sportspeople in Kazakhstan
Serbian First League players
Serbian footballers
Serbian SuperLiga players
Super League Greece players
1985 births
Living people